Presidential elections were held in Belarus on 19 March 2006. The result was a victory for incumbent, President Alexander Lukashenko, who received 84.4% of the vote. However, Western observers deemed the elections rigged. The Organization for Security and Co-operation in Europe (OSCE) declared that the election "failed to meet OSCE commitments for democratic elections". In contrast, election observers from the Commonwealth of Independent States (CIS) described the vote as open and transparent.

Candidates
On 17 February 2006, the Central Election Commission approved the following list of candidates:
Alexander Lukashenko: incumbent, in office since 1994, not associated with any party.
Alaksandar Milinkievič: challenger, candidate from an opposition union, United Democratic Forces of Belarus.
Sergei Gaidukevich: Liberal Democratic Party.
Alyaksandr Kazulin: Belarusian Social Democratic Party.

Former candidates
Zianon Pazniak: withdrew on 26 January
Valeri Frolov: withdrew on 1 February in favor of Kazulin
Aleksandr Voitovich: withdrew on 9 January
Sergei Skrebets: withdrew in late January, supports Kazulin

Conduct
Both the European Parliament and United States Congress issued warnings that more sanctions and similar punitive actions would be imposed if there were human rights violations during the elections. The United States already had placed sanctions on Belarus due to past election issues. The Belarus Democracy Act of 2004 allowed the provision of assistance to political parties and NGOs. The CIS observer mission commented that "the negative statements made in the EU and the United States are attempts to create predetermined negative sentiments in the international community toward elections results in Belarus. Such actions towards a sovereign state hardly comply with standards of international law." The OSCE also sent monitors to Belarus to observe the elections and to make sure the elections were free from any irregularities.

On 2 March 2006, opposition candidate Alyaksandr Kazulin attempted to enter the third meeting of the All Belarusian People's Assembly, which was hosted by President Lukashenko. Security officers arrested and assaulted Kazulin, who was charged with disorderly conduct, and then held in custody for eight hours.

In the build-up to the elections, several Georgians who were part of the OSCE observer team were intercepted by the Belarusian Frontier Guard  and placed in custody. Lukashenko also announced that protests similar to those of the Orange, Rose and Tulip revolutions would not take place in Belarus and stated that "force will not be used" to claim the presidency.

Results
On 19 March, exit polls showed Lukashenko winning a third term in a landslide, amid opposition claims of vote-rigging and fear of violence. The Gallup Organization has noted that the Belarusian Committee of Youth Organization is government-controlled and released their exit poll results before noon on election day, although voting stations closed at 20:00.

Lukashenko was sworn in for his third term on 8 April 2006.

Reactions

Belarusian authorities
Belarusian authorities initially vowed to crush unrest in the event of large-scale protests following the election. Later on, however, more subtle methods of attrition were used to subdue protesters. Lukashenko declared victory and defeat of "The Jeans Revolution", promising not to jail Milinkevich and Kozulin.

On 23 March, the Constitutional Court of Belarus rejected the opposition's appeals. Lukashenko was inaugurated five days later.

On 24 March, Belarusian police broke up days of protests in central Minsk against President Lukashenko's re-election, detaining about 460 demonstrators in an early hours sweep. The demonstrators had rejected police calls to leave the square, the focus of the protests. They had erected tents and kept protesting around the clock despite sub-zero temperatures at night. One of the detained protesters called Reuters by mobile phone and said they were being taken to a pre-trial detention centre in the capital.

On 25 March, riot police clashed with protesters, forcing demonstrators back and hitting several with truncheons. One of the protesters was killed in the fight. Four explosions were reported, apparently percussion grenades set off by police. Many protesters were detained, including one of the opposition leaders, Alexander Kozulin, Russian news agencies reported. The main opposition leader, Alexander Milinkevich, denied reports by Russian news agencies that he himself was detained.

On 29 March, it was reported by Gaseta.ru that opposition leader Kozulin had been arrested and was facing up to 6 years in jail for organizing riots and hooliganism. Milinkevich faced 15 days for hooliganism.

According to Moscow News,  two journalists of the Belarus state television were allegedly beaten by opposition forces during an unsanctioned rally in Minsk and were hospitalized with severe injuries. Reporter of First Belarusian State Channel, Mikhail Kristin, suffered a concussion, and cameraman Dmitry Chumak suffered a spine injury. The journalists were injured during the Saturday unrest in the Belarusian capital. Members of opposition called it a lie.

Belarusian opposition

After the results were announced, a mass rally assembled in October Square in Minsk, waving the banned white-red-white flag of independent Belarus, the flag of Europe, as well as flags of other countries such as Ukraine, Poland, Russia, Georgia, and even Armenia.

The crowd of demonstrators rallying after the election - estimated at 5,000 to 10,000  - was the biggest the opposition had mustered in years. The next day a tent camp was erected on October Square in downtown Minsk. The number of participants in the opposition rally varied from 300 in the morning to 5,000 in the evening. The main opposition leaders had called for the protests to keep up until Saturday, when a major rally is expected, coinciding with the anniversary of the creation of first independent Belarusian Republic in 1918. Despite this, on Friday night riot police were dispatched to the site of the protest and 377 (460, according to other sources) participants and journalists were arrested, effectively dismantling the demonstration. Most of the arrested people were sentenced to between 5 and 15 days in prison. There were Russian, Polish, Ukrainian, Canadian, and Georgian citizens among the arrested. The protests were documented in the movie "Kalinovski Square" by filmmaker Jury Chaščavacki.

On Saturday, tens of thousands of demonstrators took to the streets, as the police had closed off October Square. Opposition leader Alyaksandr Kazulin was arrested. One of the demonstrators was killed when the riot police dispersed the crowd.

Western countries
The official OSCE report released on March 20, 2006, concluded that the presidential election failed to meet OSCE commitments for democratic elections.  The OSCE, of which Belarus is a member, stated that Lukashenko permitted State authority to be used in a manner which did not allow citizens to freely and fairly express their will at the ballot box, and a pattern of intimidation and the suppression of independent voices was evident.

On 21 March, the United States stated that it believed that the election was rigged. In the words of White House spokesman Scott McClellan, "The United States does not accept the results of the election. We support the call for a new election."

Czech President Václav Klaus decided not to congratulate Lukashenko on re-election as president as "the course of the presidential elections on Sunday confirmed his fears for democracy in Belarus". Klaus previously criticized "very disputable circumstances of the parliamentary elections and the changes in the constitution that allowed Lukashenko to run for the post again after two election terms" in his open letter to Lukashenko last year. Czech Foreign Minister Cyril Svoboda proposed inviting opposition leader Alyaksander Milinkevich to the EU summit. As his proposal did not succeed he initiated invitation of Milinkevich to the European People's Party meeting that will take place prior the EU summit.

According to the Czech News Agency, Jan Rybar, reporter of the Czech daily Mlada fronta Dnes, was attacked and beaten up at the opposition demonstration in Minsk. He said in his opinion he had been beaten up by agents of the Belarusian secret police KGB, but has no direct piece of evidence to prove it.

On 23 March, American diplomats evacuated Vyacheslav Sivchik, one of the organizers of the opposition meeting, from Oktyabrskaya Square.

On 24 March, EU leaders agreed at a summit to impose sanctions on Belarus leaders, including a possible travel ban on Lukashenko, after his victory in a disputed presidential election on Sunday. Officials said Lukashenko had won more than 80% of the vote. A statement from the 25 leaders called the country "a sad exception ... on a continent of open and democratic societies" and said the election had violated democratic norms. "The European council has decided to take restrictive measures against those responsible for the violations of international electoral standards, including President Lukashenko," the Austrian foreign minister, Ursula Plassnik, said after the EU summit. She gave no details, but EU officials said measures being considered included visa bans on those accused of allegedly rigging the poll and possible asset freezes, but not economic sanctions against the former Soviet republic.

Lukashenko was banned from entering the 25 nations of the EU - including Belarus' neighbours, Poland, Latvia and Lithuania - and from the US.  The EU Council has passed a list of Belarusian officials targeted by sanctions.

Russia
Russia considered the election results acceptable; the Russian Foreign Ministry declared the election fair, and Russian president Vladimir Putin called Lukashenko to congratulate him on his victory.

The Russian Foreign Ministry condemned alleged OSCE bias, saying "The biased verdict of the OSCE, Europe's main election monitoring organization, on the presidential election in Belarus highlights the need to improve the process of observing polls, an official spokesman for the Russian Foreign Ministry said Tuesday. "We believe that the biased nature of the verdict of the monitoring mission has again confirmed the importance of beginning, at last, focused work to correct shortcomings in the election monitoring practice," Mikhail Kamynin said referring to a decision made by foreign ministers of the 55-nation security grouping in December last year. On 24 March Sergey Lavrov accused OSCE of instigating tensions during the parliamentary election campaign in Belarus, claiming that "long before the elections, the OSCE's Office for Democratic Institutions and Human Rights had declared that they (the elections) would be illegitimate and it was pretty biased in its commentaries on their progress and results, thus playing an instigating role." It was one of many Russian criticisms of the trans-Atlantic group's vote monitoring activities.

Pro-government press and organizations lauded the outcome as a defeat of "orange" political technologies, whereas the liberal opposition traditionally condemned Lukashenko's actions. On March 26,  about ten people from liberal movements and parties, joined by occasional passers-by, attempted to carry out an unsanctioned demonstration in support of the Belarusian opposition near the building of the Ministry of International Affairs, but were quickly dispersed by authorities.

Reflecting a widespread belief among journalists, Russian commentator Piotr Parhomenko wrote in lenta.ru  that Lukashenko's decision to allow the opposition demonstration was a move calculated to divide the opposition, as Kozulin wanted to stop the protests while Milinkevich called for them to go on indefinitely.

Lukashenko
According to a Belarusian news portal, Lukashenko himself stated that the "last Presidential elections were rigged; I already told this to the Westerners. [...] 93.5% voted for the President Lukashenko [sic]. They said it's not a European number. We made it 86. This really happened. And if [one is to] start recounting the votes, I don't know what to do with them. Before the elections they told us that if we showed the European numbers, our elections would be accepted. We were planning to make the European numbers. But, as you can see, this didn't help either."

See also
Jeans Revolution
A Lesson of Belarusian

References

External links

Central Election Commission of the Republic of Belarus
Coverage of the election 
ePolitics 2006: Online Campaigning in 2006 Presidential Election in Belarus
Guardian editorial on plausibility of un-rigged Lukashenko landslide

Presidential elections in Belarus
Belarus
President
Belarus